The Montreal Olympic Pool was constructed for the 1976 Summer Olympics as part of the Montreal Olympic Park. The Olympic Pool is part of the larger swimming centre, located in the base of the inclined Montreal Tower. The centre has a spectator capacity of 3,012 seats.

At the 1976 Olympics, the venue hosted swimming, diving, water polo, and the swimming part of the modern pentathlon events. It had a capacity of 10,000 seats at the time (6,988 temporary seats were installed).

The building was designed by French architect Roger Taillibert, who also designed the Olympic Stadium and Olympic Village.

The structure, along with the accompanying velodrome, inspired Taillibert's later designs for Luxembourg's National Sports and Culture Centre.

Outside of the actual aquatic complex, inside the tower, a small museum exists, commemorating the 1976 Games as well as Games past, with posters and displays in French and English.

The pool was used as a filming venue for the Olympic-themed film Nadia, Butterfly.

References

1976 Summer Olympics official report. Volume 2. pp. 66–75.
Parc Olympique. 1992. Les Messageries de presse Benjamin Inc. .

External links
 Official site

Venues of the 1976 Summer Olympics
Sports venues in Montreal
Swimming venues in Quebec
Olympic diving venues
Olympic modern pentathlon venues
Olympic swimming venues
Olympic water polo venues
Mercier–Hochelaga-Maisonneuve
Sports venues completed in 1976